Ben MacDougall (born 25 May 1977) is a former professional rugby footballer of the 1990s, 2000s and 2010s. After playing rugby league in Australia for the Western Suburbs Magpies, Newcastle Knights, Manly Warringah Sea Eagles and Melbourne Storm, he started playing rugby union in the United Kingdom, and represented Scotland internationally.

Background
Born in Sydney, New South Wales, Ben MacDougall has three siblings, Adam MacDougall, Luke MacDougall and Scott MacDougall, all three of whom would also become rugby league players, and son of former NRL player Gil MacDougall

Playing career
MacDougall made his first grade debut for the Western Suburbs Magpies in round 6 of the 1998 NRL season. He joined the Newcastle Knights in the 2000 season. In 2001-2002 he played for the Northern Eagles who then reverted to the Manly Sea Eagles in 2003.

He played rugby union in Scotland for three years from 2004 to 2007, representing the Scotland national rugby union team. MacDougall qualified for Scotland through his grandfather, Alan, who came from Glasgow.He made his Scotland debut against Wales on 12 February 2006 in a 2006 Six Nations Championship match at the Millennium Stadium.

MacDougall joined Edinburgh Rugby in 2004 and in 2006 moved to the Border Reivers. MacDougall joined London Scottish in the 2010/11 season and helped them win the RFU National One trophy and get promoted into the RFU The Championship for the 2011/2012 season.

Before departing for Scotland in 2005, MacDougall played for the Western Suburbs Magpies, the Newcastle Knights, the Northern Eagles, the Manly-Warringah Sea Eagles and the Melbourne Storm in the National Rugby League.

Career highlights
 First Grade Debut: 1998 - Round 6, Western Suburbs vs South Sydney Rabbitohs at Aussie Stadium, 19 April
 International Debut (RU): 2006 - Scotland vs Wales at Cardiff, 12 February in the Six Nations Championship

Footnotes

External links
Scrum Player Profile
NEWCASTLE KNIGHTS PLAYER NUMBERS - 1988 TO PRESENT

1977 births
Living people
Australian people of Scottish descent
Australian rugby league players
Australian rugby union players
Edinburgh Rugby players
Ben
Manly Warringah Sea Eagles players
Melbourne Storm players
Newcastle Knights players
Northern Eagles players
Rugby league centres
Rugby league players from Sydney
Rugby union players from Sydney
Scotland international rugby union players
Scottish rugby union players
Western Suburbs Magpies players